Mark Anthony Nipaya Geraldo (born 12 July 1991) is a Filipino professional boxer.

He lost to Takuma Inoue for the OPBF super flyweight title.

He has a loss to former world champion McJoe Arroyo and victories over world champion Jerwin Ancajas and Tanawat Phonnaku.

In 2017, Geraldo won his first regional title, the WBO Oriental bantamweight title.

He has been ranked at least as high as 3rd by the WBO and 9th by the IBF.

References

External links
 

1991 births
Super-flyweight boxers
Living people
Filipino male boxers
21st-century Filipino people